The 1967 Mississippi State Bulldogs football team represented Mississippi State University during the 1967 NCAA University Division football season. The Bulldogs finished 1–9 in the first season for head coach Charles Shira, who had previously served as defensive coordinator at Texas.

Schedule

References

Mississippi State
Mississippi State Bulldogs football seasons
Mississippi State Bulldogs football